"Heartbeat" is a song by South Korean boy band BTS, released on June 28, 2019, as the fourth and main single from and in tandem with the album BTS World: Original Soundtrack. A music video was released alongside the song.

Background
The song is described as having a "pop-rock melody" featuring the group's "dulcet vocals" as well as lyrics about destiny, which were also called a "love letter" to the group's fans. The song was revealed in the game prior to the soundtrack's release, but players had to first reach mission 14 of the first chapter to listen to it.

Music video
The music video was also released on June 28, featuring "fantasy-meets-reality visuals which sees all seven members on their own journeys". It has been described as intermedial and self-reflexive.

Charts

References

2019 singles
2019 songs
BTS songs
Pop rock songs
Songs written by Bang Si-hyuk
Songs written by RM (rapper)
Songs written by J-Hope
Hybe Corporation singles